Mohammad Modabber (6 October 1908 – 21 April 1984) was a Bangladeshi journalist. He was awarded Bangla Academy Literary Award in 1965 and Ekushey Padak in 1979 by the Government of Bangladesh for his contribution to journalism.

Career
Modabber pursued his journalistic career from 1924 to 1945. He served as the news editor of the daily newspaper The Azad in the 1940s.
Modabber led the  "Mukul Child Movement" with a view to ensuring the rights of children and juveniles. He was an anti-British movement leader and was arrested several times because of his involvement in the movement.

References

1908 births
1984 deaths
Bangladeshi journalists
Recipients of the Ekushey Padak
Recipients of Bangla Academy Award
Place of death missing
20th-century journalists
Indian journalists